is a railway station in Nishi-ku, Hamamatsu, Shizuoka Prefecture, Japan, operated by the Central Japan Railway Company (JR Tōkai ).

Lines

Station layout
Maisaka Station has a side platform serving Track 1 and an island platform serving Track 2 and Track 3, connected by a footbridge. Track 1 is used only during peak hours. The station building has automated ticket machines, TOICA automated turnstiles and is staffed.

Platforms

Adjacent stations

|-
!colspan=5|Central Japan Railway Company

Station history
Maisaka Station was opened on September 1, 1888 when the section of the Tōkaidō Main Line connecting Hamamatsu Station with Ōbu Station was completed. It was originally named . It was renamed Maisaka on December 1, 1888, but the kanji spelling of its name assumed its present form only in 1940. Regularly scheduled freight service was discontinued in 1971.

Station numbering was introduced to the section of the Tōkaidō Line operated JR Central in March 2018; Maisaka Station was assigned station number CA36.

Passenger statistics
In fiscal 2017, the station was used by an average of 2719 passengers daily (boarding passengers only).

Surrounding area
Lake Hamana

See also
 List of Railway Stations in Japan

References

Yoshikawa, Fumio. Tokaido-sen 130-nen no ayumi. Grand-Prix Publishing (2002) .

External links

Official home page 

Stations of Central Japan Railway Company
Tōkaidō Main Line
Railway stations in Japan opened in 1888
Railway stations in Shizuoka Prefecture
Railway stations in Hamamatsu